Skardu International Airport  is an international civil airport in Skardu, in the Pakistani territory of Gilgit-Baltistan. It also serves as a forward operating base of the Pakistan Air Force.

On 2 December 2021, Skardu Airport was designated and re-inaugurated as an international airport after providing upgrades to the airport to become a tourism hub for Gilgit-Baltistan.

Runways

Skardu Airport has two asphalt runways, both 11,944 ft (3,641 m) long, while a third 8,740 ft (2,664 m) long asphalt runway, Runway 15/33, was de-commissioned in December 2021 and is currently used as an apron/taxiway.

Airlines and destinations

Skardu Airport is connected to Pakistan's capital, Islamabad, through regular Pakistan International Airlines flights, as well as frequent flights to Lahore, Multan, Faisalabad, Sialkot and Karachi.

Flydubai has submitted a request to start international operations to and from Skardu airport, which would potentially become the first airline to start international routes from Skardu.

See also
 List of airports in Pakistan
 Pakistan Civil Aviation Authority
 Gilgit Airport
 Airlines of Pakistan
 Chilas Airfield

References

External links

Airports in Gilgit-Baltistan
International airports in Pakistan